"Fire in Me" is a song by English singer John Newman. The song was released as a digital download on 9 March 2018 by Island Records. The song peaked at number 59 on Scottish Singles Chart. The song was written by John Newman, James Newman, Phil Plested and David Mørup.

Background
In an interview with Metro, Newman said, "I've got new music, lots of it as well. I'm bombarding you. I've been hiding and writing and just waiting until the time is right to release loads. I've lost the pressure, it's been too long. I've taken time away, I'm making music I want to make. I've always been doing that but I felt like I lost myself a little. But it feels good to be back."

Track listing

Personnel
Credits adapted from Tidal.
 Dehiro – producer, co-producer
 John Newman – producer, composer, lyricist, associated performer, co-producer, marimba, organ, percussion, string arranger, synthesizer, vocals
 Mark Ralph – producer, associated performer, bass guitar, co-producer, keyboards, synthesizer
 David Mørup – composer, lyricist, associated performer, guitar, keyboards, percussion
 James Newman – composer, lyricist, associated performer, background vocalist
 Phil Plested – composer, lyricist, associated performer, background vocalist
 Robin Florent – assistant mixer, studio personnel
 Scott Desmarais – assistant mixer, studio personnel
 Ava Ralph – associated performer, saxophone
 Max McElligott – associated performer, background vocalist
 Scott Ralph – associated performer, bass trombone, trombone, trumpet
 Pete Hutchings – engineer, studio personnel
 Tom AD Fuller – engineer, studio personnel
 Matt Colton – mastering engineer, studio personnel
 Chris Galland – mix engineer, studio personnel
 Manny Marroquin – mixer, studio personnel

Charts

Release history

References

2018 singles
2018 songs
Island Records singles
John Newman (singer) songs
Songs written by James Newman (musician)
Songs written by John Newman (singer)